Kami is the surname of the following notable people:
Hisao Kami (born 1941), Japanese football player and manager
Sompal Kami (born 1996), Nepalese cricketer
Tomoko Kami, Japanese politician

Japanese-language surnames